Alien She was an art exhibition curated by, artists and former Riot Grrls, Astria Suparak and Ceci Moss and was organized by the Miller Gallery at Carnegie Mellon. Alien She was the first art exhibition to examine the impact, the musical genre, Riot grrrl had on the artists and cultural producers of today. The exhibition's title serves as a reference to a Bikini Kill song of the same title name.

Exhibition 
Alien She showcases the work of seven contemporary artists whose visual art practices were inspired by the genre of Riot Grrrl. The artists, in this exhibition, show off several of their projects spanning the last 20 years, including both new and rarely seen works. Such contemporary art pieces on display at this exhibition include sculptures, photographs, artist publications, videos, and drawings. These works offer viewers of the gallery insight into the artistic diversity of the Riot Grrrl movement and demonstrate how the ideals of the Riot Grrrl movement have evolved through the works of contemporary artists today.

The exhibition’s historical section was designed to reflect the "living history" of the Riot Grrl Movement. This section consists of hundreds of self-published zines and hand-designed posters solicited from institutional and personal archives. This section also includes a listening station that plays music playlists representative of the different Riot Grrrl scenes across the U.S., Canada, South America, and Europe. Such playlists are guest curated by musicians and DJs, and are accompanied by records, cassettes, set lists, band T-shirts, and other Riot Grrrl memorabilia. 

The art exhibition began its nationwide tour on September 20th, 2016 at the Miller Gallery at Carnegie Mellon. It was then presented at Vox Populi from March 7th- April 27th, 2014. In the Fall of 2014, the exhibition was shown at the Yerba Buena Center for the Arts; then at the Orange County Museum of Art in the Spring of 2015. It was last showcased,in the Fall of 2015, at the Pacific Northwest College of Art: 511 Gallery & Museum of Contemporary Craft, in conjunction with Portland Institute for Contemporary Art’s Time-Based Art Festival.

Reception 
The exhibition was reviewed in the Journal of Modern Craft, the Los Angeles Times, and the CAA Journal.

Artists 
Many of the artists showcased in the exhibition work across multiple artistic disciplines including: sculpture, installation, video, documentary film, photography, drawing, printmaking, new media, social practice, curation, music, writing and performance. The artists included in the exhibition all have worked collaboratively and many of them have built platforms for other under-recognized artists and groups to connect and self-publish their works. 

 Ginger Brooks Takahashi (Pittsburgh) 
 Tammy Rae Carland (Oakland)
 Miranda July (Los Angeles)
 Faythe Levine (Milwaukee)
 Allyson Mitchell (Toronto)
 L.J. Roberts (Brooklyn) 
 Stephanie Syjuco (San Francisco)

References

External links 
 https://twitter.com/AlienSheExhibit 

Wikipedia Student Program
Contemporary art exhibitions
Art exhibitions in the United States